The 1926–27 William & Mary Indians men's basketball team represented the College of William & Mary in intercollegiate basketball during the 1926–27 season. Under the fourth year of head coach J. Wilder Tasker (who concurrently served as the head football and baseball coach), the team finished the season with a 7–8 record. This was the 22nd season of the collegiate basketball program at William & Mary, whose nickname is now the Tribe. William & Mary played the season as an independent.

Schedule

|-
!colspan=9 style="background:#006400; color:#FFD700;"| Regular season

Source

References

William & Mary Tribe men's basketball seasons
William And Mary Indians
William and Mary Indians Men's Basketball Team
William and Mary Indians Men's Basketball Team